Calcium carbonate is a chemical compound with the chemical formula . It is a common substance found in rocks as the minerals calcite and aragonite (most notably as limestone, which is a type of sedimentary rock consisting mainly of calcite) and is the main component of eggshells, gastropod shells, shellfish skeletons and pearls. Things containing much calcium carbonate or resembling it are described as calcareous. Calcium carbonate is the active ingredient in agricultural lime and is created when calcium ions in hard water react with carbonate ions to create limescale. It has medical use as a calcium supplement or as an antacid, but excessive consumption can be hazardous and cause hypercalcemia and digestive issues.

Chemistry
Calcium carbonate shares the typical properties of other carbonates. Notably it
CaCO_3(s) {+}  2H^{+}(aq) -> Ca^{2+}(aq) + CO2(g) + H_2O(l)
releases carbon dioxide upon heating, called a thermal decomposition reaction, or calcination (to above 840 °C in the case of ), to form calcium oxide, CaO, commonly called quicklime, with reaction enthalpy 178 kJ/mol:
CaCO3(s)->[\Delta]CaO(s){+}CO2\uparrow

Calcium carbonate reacts with water that is saturated with carbon dioxide to form the soluble calcium bicarbonate.
CaCO3(s){+}CO2(g){+}H2O(l)-> Ca(HCO3)2(aq)

This reaction is important in the erosion of carbonate rock, forming caverns, and leads to hard water in many regions.

An unusual form of calcium carbonate is the hexahydrate ikaite, . Ikaite is stable only below 8 °C.

Preparation
The vast majority of calcium carbonate used in industry is extracted by mining or quarrying. Pure calcium carbonate (such as for food or pharmaceutical use), can be produced from a pure quarried source (usually marble).

Alternatively, calcium carbonate is prepared from calcium oxide. Water is added to give calcium hydroxide then carbon dioxide is passed through this solution to precipitate the desired calcium carbonate, referred to in the industry as precipitated calcium carbonate (PCC) This process is called carbonatation:

CaO{+}H2O->Ca(OH)2
Ca(OH)2{+}CO2->CaCO3{+}H_2O
In a laboratory, calcium carbonate can easily be crystallized from calcium chloride (CaCl2), by placing an aqueous solution of CaCl2 in a desiccator alongside ammonium carbonate (NH4)2CO3. In the desiccator, ammonium carbonate is exposed to air and decomposes into ammonia, carbon dioxide, and water. The carbon dioxide then diffuses into the aqueous solution of calcium chloride, reacts with the calcium ions and the water, and forms calcium carbonate.

Structure
The thermodynamically stable form of  under normal conditions is hexagonal β- (the mineral calcite). Other forms can be prepared, the denser (2.83 g/cm3) orthorhombic λ- (the mineral aragonite) and hexagonal μ-, occurring as the mineral vaterite. The aragonite form can be prepared by precipitation at temperatures above 85 °C; the vaterite form can be prepared by precipitation at 60 °C. Calcite contains calcium atoms coordinated by six oxygen atoms; in aragonite they are coordinated by nine oxygen atoms. The vaterite structure is not fully understood. Magnesium carbonate has the calcite structure, whereas strontium carbonate and barium carbonate adopt the aragonite structure, reflecting their larger ionic radii.

Polymorphs 
Calcium carbonate crystallizes in three anhydrous polymorphs, of which calcite is the thermodynamically most stable at room temperature, aragonite is only slightly less so, and vaterite is the least stable.

Crystal Structure 
The calcite crystal structure is trigonal, with space group  (No. 167 in the International Tables for Crystallography), and Pearson symbol . Aragonite is orthorhombic, with space group  (No 62), and Pearson Symbol . Vaterite is composed of at least two different coexisting crystallographic structures. The major structure exhibits hexagonal symmetry in space group , the minor structure is still unknown.

Crystallization 

All three polymorphs crystallize simultaneously from aqueous solutions under ambient conditions. In additive-free aqueous solutions, calcite forms easily as the major product, while aragonite appears only as a minor product.

At high saturation, vaterite is typically the first phase precipitated, which is followed by a transformation of the vaterite to calcite. This behavior seems to follow Ostwald's rule, in which the least stable polymorph crystallizes first, followed by the crystallization of different polymorphs via a sequence of increasingly stable phases. However, aragonite, whose stability lies between those of vaterite and calcite, seems to be the exception to this rule, as aragonite does not form as a precursor to calcite under ambient conditions.

Aragonite occurs in majority when the reaction conditions inhibit the formation of calcite and/or promote the nucleation of aragonite. For example, the formation of aragonite is promoted by the presence of magnesium ions, or by using proteins and peptides derived from biological calcium carbonate. Some polyamines such as cadaverine and Poly(ethylene imine) have been shown to facilitate the formation of aragonite over calcite.

Selection by organisms 
Organisms, such as molluscs and arthropods, have shown the ability to grow all three crystal polymorphs of calcium carbonate, mainly as protection (shells) and muscle attachments. Moreover, they exhibit a remarkable capability of phase selection over calcite and aragonite, and some organisms can switch between the two polymorphs. The ability of phase selection is usually attributed to the use of specific macromolecules or combinations of macromolecules by such organisms.

Occurrence

Geological sources
Calcite, aragonite and vaterite are pure calcium carbonate minerals. Industrially important source rocks which are predominantly calcium carbonate include limestone, chalk, marble and travertine.

Biological sources

Eggshells, snail shells and most seashells are predominantly calcium carbonate and can be used as industrial sources of that chemical. Oyster shells have enjoyed recent recognition as a source of dietary calcium, but are also a practical industrial source. Dark green vegetables such as broccoli and kale contain dietarily significant amounts of calcium carbonate, but they are not practical as an industrial source.

Extraterrestrial
Beyond Earth, strong evidence suggests the presence of calcium carbonate on Mars. Signs of calcium carbonate have been detected at more than one location (notably at Gusev and Huygens craters). This provides some evidence for the past presence of liquid water.

Geology

Carbonate is found frequently in geologic settings and constitutes an enormous carbon reservoir. Calcium carbonate occurs as aragonite, calcite and dolomite as significant constituents of the calcium cycle. The carbonate minerals form the rock types: limestone, chalk, marble, travertine, tufa, and others.

In warm, clear tropical waters corals are more abundant than towards the poles where the waters are cold. Calcium carbonate contributors, including plankton (such as coccoliths and planktic foraminifera), coralline algae, sponges, brachiopods, echinoderms, bryozoa and mollusks, are typically found in shallow water environments where sunlight and filterable food are more abundant. Cold-water carbonates do exist at higher latitudes but have a very slow growth rate. The calcification processes are changed by ocean acidification.

Where the oceanic crust is subducted under a continental plate sediments will be carried down to warmer zones in the asthenosphere and lithosphere. Under these conditions calcium carbonate decomposes to produce carbon dioxide which, along with other gases, give rise to explosive volcanic eruptions.

Carbonate compensation depth
The carbonate compensation depth (CCD) is the point in the ocean where the rate of precipitation of calcium carbonate is balanced by the rate of dissolution due to the conditions present. Deep in the ocean, the temperature drops and pressure increases. Calcium carbonate is unusual in that its solubility increases with decreasing temperature. Increasing pressure also increases the solubility of calcium carbonate. The carbonate compensation depth can range from 4,000 to 6,000 meters below sea level.

Role in taphonomy
Calcium carbonate can preserve fossils through permineralization. Most of the vertebrate fossils of the Two Medicine Formation—a geologic formation known for its duck-billed dinosaur eggs—are preserved by  permineralization. This type of preservation conserves high levels of detail, even down to the microscopic level. However, it also leaves specimens vulnerable to weathering when exposed to the surface.

Trilobite populations were once thought to have composed the majority of aquatic life during the Cambrian, due to the fact that their calcium carbonate-rich shells were more easily preserved than those of other species, which had purely chitinous shells.

Uses

Construction
The main use of calcium carbonate is in the construction industry, either as a building material, or limestone aggregate for road building, as an ingredient of cement, or as the starting material for the preparation of builders' lime by burning in a kiln. However, because of weathering mainly caused by acid rain, calcium carbonate (in limestone form) is no longer used for building purposes on its own, but only as a raw primary substance for building materials.

Calcium carbonate is also used in the purification of iron from iron ore in a blast furnace. The carbonate is calcined in situ to give calcium oxide, which forms a slag with various impurities present, and separates from the purified iron.

In the oil industry, calcium carbonate is added to drilling fluids as a formation-bridging and filtercake-sealing agent; it is also a weighting material which increases the density of drilling fluids to control the downhole pressure. Calcium carbonate is added to swimming pools, as a pH corrector for maintaining alkalinity and offsetting the acidic properties of the disinfectant agent.

It is also used as a raw material in the refining of sugar from sugar beet; it is calcined in a kiln with anthracite to produce calcium oxide and carbon dioxide. This burnt lime is then slaked in fresh water to produce a calcium hydroxide suspension for the precipitation of impurities in raw juice during carbonatation.

Calcium carbonate in the form of chalk has traditionally been a major component of blackboard chalk. However, modern manufactured chalk is mostly gypsum, hydrated calcium sulfate . Calcium carbonate is a main source for growing biorock. Precipitated calcium carbonate (PCC), pre-dispersed in slurry form, is a common filler material for latex gloves with the aim of achieving maximum saving in material and production costs.

Fine ground calcium carbonate (GCC) is an essential ingredient in the microporous film used in diapers and some building films, as the pores are nucleated around the calcium carbonate particles during the manufacture of the film by biaxial stretching. GCC and PCC are used as a filler in paper because they are cheaper than wood fiber. In terms of market volume, GCC are the most important types of fillers currently used. Printing and writing paper can contain 10–20% calcium carbonate. In North America, calcium carbonate has begun to replace kaolin in the production of glossy paper. Europe has been practicing this as alkaline papermaking or acid-free papermaking for some decades. PCC used for paper filling and paper coatings is precipitated and prepared in a variety of shapes and sizes having characteristic narrow particle size distributions and equivalent spherical diameters of 0.4 to 3 micrometers.

Calcium carbonate is widely used as an extender in paints, in particular matte emulsion paint where typically 30% by weight of the paint is either chalk or marble. It is also a popular filler in plastics. Some typical examples include around 15 to 20% loading of chalk in unplasticized polyvinyl chloride (uPVC) drainpipes, 5% to 15% loading of stearate-coated chalk or marble in uPVC window profile. PVC cables can use calcium carbonate at loadings of up to 70 phr (parts per hundred parts of resin) to improve mechanical properties (tensile strength and elongation) and electrical properties (volume resistivity). Polypropylene compounds are often filled with calcium carbonate to increase rigidity, a requirement that becomes important at high usage temperatures. Here the percentage is often 20–40%. It also routinely used as a filler in thermosetting resins (sheet and bulk molding compounds) and has also been mixed with ABS, and other ingredients, to form some types of compression molded "clay" poker chips. Precipitated calcium carbonate, made by dropping calcium oxide into water, is used by itself or with additives as a white paint, known as whitewashing.

Calcium carbonate is added to a wide range of trade and do it yourself adhesives, sealants, and decorating fillers. Ceramic tile adhesives typically contain 70% to 80% limestone. Decorating crack fillers contain similar levels of marble or dolomite. It is also mixed with putty in setting stained glass windows, and as a resist to prevent glass from sticking to kiln shelves when firing glazes and paints at high temperature.

In ceramic glaze applications, calcium carbonate is known as whiting, and is a common ingredient for many glazes in its white powdered form. When a glaze containing this material is fired in a kiln, the whiting acts as a flux material in the glaze. Ground calcium carbonate is an abrasive (both as scouring powder and as an ingredient of household scouring creams), in particular in its calcite form, which has the relatively low hardness level of 3 on the Mohs scale, and will therefore not scratch glass and most other ceramics, enamel, bronze, iron, and steel, and have a moderate effect on softer metals like aluminium and copper. A paste made from calcium carbonate and deionized water can be used to clean tarnish on silver.

Health and diet

Calcium carbonate is widely used medicinally as an inexpensive dietary calcium supplement for gastric antacid (such as Tums and Eno). It may be used as a phosphate binder for the treatment of hyperphosphatemia (primarily in patients with chronic kidney failure). It is used in the pharmaceutical industry as an inert filler for tablets and other pharmaceuticals.

Calcium carbonate is used in the production of calcium oxide as well as toothpaste and has seen a resurgence as a food preservative and color retainer, when used in or with products such as organic apples.

Calcium carbonate is used therapeutically as phosphate binder in patients on maintenance haemodialysis. It is the most common form of phosphate binder prescribed, particularly in non-dialysis chronic kidney disease. Calcium carbonate is the most commonly used phosphate binder, but clinicians are increasingly prescribing the more expensive, non-calcium-based phosphate binders, particularly sevelamer.

Excess calcium from supplements, fortified food, and high-calcium diets can cause milk-alkali syndrome, which has serious toxicity and can be fatal. In 1915, Bertram Sippy introduced the "Sippy regimen" of hourly ingestion of milk and cream, and the gradual addition of eggs and cooked cereal, for 10 days, combined with alkaline powders, which provided symptomatic relief for peptic ulcer disease. Over the next several decades, the Sippy regimen resulted in kidney failure, alkalosis, and hypercalcaemia, mostly in men with peptic ulcer disease. These adverse effects were reversed when the regimen stopped, but it was fatal in some patients with protracted vomiting. Milk-alkali syndrome declined in men after effective treatments for peptic ulcer disease arose. Since the 1990s it has been most frequently reported in women taking calcium supplements above the recommended range of 1.2 to 1.5 grams daily, for prevention and treatment of osteoporosis, and is exacerbated by dehydration. Calcium has been added to over-the-counter products, which contributes to inadvertent excessive intake. Excessive calcium intake can lead to hypercalcemia, complications of which include vomiting, abdominal pain and altered mental status.

As a food additive it is designated E170, and it has an INS number of 170. Used as an acidity regulator, anticaking agent, stabilizer or color it is approved for usage in the EU, US and Australia and New Zealand. It is "added by law to all UK milled bread flour except wholemeal". It is used in some soy milk and almond milk products as a source of dietary calcium; at least one study suggests that calcium carbonate might be as bioavailable as the calcium in cow's milk. Calcium carbonate is also used as a firming agent in many canned and bottled vegetable products.

Several calcium supplement formulations have been documented to contain the chemical element lead, posing a public health concern. Lead is commonly found in natural sources of calcium.

Agriculture and aquaculture
Agricultural lime, powdered chalk or limestone, is used as a cheap method for neutralising acidic soil, making it suitable for planting, also used in aquaculture industry for pH regulation of pond soil before initiating culture.

Household cleaning
Calcium carbonate is a key ingredient in many household cleaning powders like Comet and is used as a scrubbing agent.

Pollution mitigation
In 1989, a researcher, Ken Simmons, introduced  into the Whetstone Brook in Massachusetts. His hope was that the calcium carbonate would counter the acid in the stream from acid rain and save the trout that had ceased to spawn. Although his experiment was a success, it did increase the amount of aluminium ions in the area of the brook that was not treated with the limestone. This shows that  can be added to neutralize the effects of acid rain in river ecosystems. Currently calcium carbonate is used to neutralize acidic conditions in both soil and water. Since the 1970s, such liming has been practiced on a large scale in Sweden to mitigate acidification and several thousand lakes and streams are limed repeatedly.

Calcium carbonate is also used in flue gas desulfurisation applications eliminating harmful  and  emissions from coal and other fossil fuels burnt in large fossil fuel power stations.

Calcination equilibrium
Calcination of limestone using charcoal fires to produce quicklime has been practiced since antiquity by cultures all over the world. The temperature at which limestone yields calcium oxide is usually given as 825 °C, but stating an absolute threshold is misleading. Calcium carbonate exists in equilibrium with calcium oxide and carbon dioxide at any temperature. At each temperature there is a partial pressure of carbon dioxide that is in equilibrium with calcium carbonate. At room temperature the equilibrium overwhelmingly favors calcium carbonate, because the equilibrium  pressure is only a tiny fraction of the partial  pressure in air, which is about 0.035 kPa.

At temperatures above 550 °C the equilibrium  pressure begins to exceed the  pressure in air. So above 550 °C, calcium carbonate begins to outgas  into air. However, in a charcoal fired kiln, the concentration of  will be much higher than it is in air.

And for it to happen rapidly, the equilibrium pressure must exceed total atmospheric pressure of 101 kPa, which happens at 898 °C.

{| class="wikitable"
|-
!P (kPa)
|0.055||0.13||0.31||1.80||5.9||9.3||14||24||34||51||72 ||80||91||101||179||901||3961
|-
!T (°C)
|550||587||605||680||727||748||777||800||830||852||871||881||891||898||937||1082||1241
|}

Solubility

With varying  pressure

Calcium carbonate is poorly soluble in pure water (47 mg/L at normal atmospheric  partial pressure as shown below).

The equilibrium of its solution is given by the equation (with dissolved calcium carbonate on the right):
{| width="500"
| style="width:50%; height:30px;"| 
|}

This seemingly simple solubility equation, however, must be taken along with the more complicated equilibrium of carbon dioxide with water (see carbonic acid).

{| width="500"
| style="width:50%; height:25px;"|    
| Ka2 =  at 25 °C
|}

 is known as the bicarbonate ion. Calcium bicarbonate is many times more soluble in water than calcium carbonate—indeed it exists only in solution.

{| width="500"
| style="width:50%; height:25px;"|   
| Ka1 =  at 25 °C
|}

Some of the  breaks up into water and dissolved carbon dioxide according to

{| width="500"
| style="width:50%; height:25px;"|   
| Kh =  at 25 °C
|}

And dissolved carbon dioxide is in equilibrium with atmospheric carbon dioxide according to

{| width="500"
| style="width:45%;"| = kH
| where kH = 29.76 atm/(mol/L) at 25 °C (Henry constant), P being the  partial pressure.
|}

For ambient air, P is around  atmospheres (or equivalently 35 Pa). The last equation above fixes the concentration of dissolved  as a function of P, independent of the concentration of dissolved . For [] = , it results in  =  moles per liter. When  is known, the remaining three equations together with

{| width="450"
| style="width:50%; height:25px;"|
| K = 10−14 at 25 °C
|}

(which is true for all aqueous solutions), and the fact that the solution must be electrically neutral, i.e., the overall charge of dissolved positive ions  must be cancelled out by the overall charge of dissolved negative ions , make it possible to solve simultaneously for the remaining five unknown concentrations (note that the previously mentioned form of the neutrality is valid only if calcium carbonate has been put in contact with pure water or with a neutral pH solution; in the case where the initial water solvent pH is not neutral, the balance is not neutral).

 At atmospheric levels of ambient  the table indicates that the solution will be slightly alkaline with a maximum  solubility of 47 mg/L.
 As ambient  partial pressure is reduced below atmospheric levels, the solution becomes more and more alkaline. For still lower  pressure,  precipitation will occur before  precipitation.

The effect of the latter is especially evident in day-to-day life of people who have hard water. Water in aquifers underground can be exposed to levels of  much higher than atmospheric. As such water percolates through calcium carbonate rock, the  dissolves according to the second trend. When that same water then emerges from the tap, in time it comes into equilibrium with  levels in the air by outgassing its excess . The calcium carbonate becomes less soluble as a result, and the excess precipitates as lime scale. This same process is responsible for the formation of stalactites and stalagmites in limestone caves.

Two hydrated phases of calcium carbonate, monohydrocalcite  and ikaite , may precipitate from water at ambient conditions and persist as metastable phases.

With varying pH, temperature and salinity:  scaling in swimming pools 

In contrast to the open equilibrium scenario above, many swimming pools are managed by addition of sodium bicarbonate to about 2 mM as a buffer, then control of pH through use of HCl, NaOH or chlorine formulations that are acidic or basic. In this situation, dissolved inorganic carbon (total inorganic carbon) is far from equilibrium with atmospheric .

In this situation, the dissociation constants for the much faster reactions

Addition of  will increase  concentration at any pH. Rearranging the equations given above, we can see that  = , and [] = . Therefore, when  concentration is known, the maximum concentration of  ions before scaling through  precipitation can be predicted from the formula:

[]max =  × 

Scaling is commonly observed in electrolytic chlorine generators, where there is a high pH near the cathode surface and scale deposition further increases temperature. This is one reason that some pool operators prefer borate over bicarbonate as the primary pH buffer, and avoid the use of pool chemicals containing calcium.

Solubility in a strong or weak acid solution
Solutions of strong (HCl), moderately strong (sulfamic) or weak (acetic, citric, sorbic, lactic, phosphoric) acids are commercially available. They are commonly used as descaling agents to remove limescale deposits. The maximum amount of  that can be "dissolved" by one liter of an acid solution can be calculated using the above equilibrium equations.
 In the case of a strong monoacid with decreasing acid concentration [A] = [], we obtain (with  molar mass = 100 g/mol):
{| class="wikitable"
|-
! width="160" |[A] (mol/L)
| 1
| 10−1
| 10−2
| 10−3
| 10−4
| 10−5
| 10−6
| 10−7
| 10−10
|-
! width="160" |Initial pH
| 0.00||1.00||2.00||3.00||4.00||5.00||6.00||6.79||7.00
|-
! width="160" |Final pH
| 6.75||7.25||7.75||8.14||8.25||8.26||8.26||8.26||8.27
|-
! width="160" |Dissolved (g/L of acid)
| 50.0||5.00||0.514||0.0849||0.0504||0.0474||0.0471||0.0470||0.0470
|}

where the initial state is the acid solution with no  (not taking into account possible  dissolution) and the final state is the solution with saturated . When the concentration decreases, [] becomes non-negligible so that the preceding expression is no longer valid.
 In the case of a weak monoacid (here we take acetic acid with pKa = 4.76) with decreasing total acid concentration [A] = [] + [AH], we obtain:

{| class="wikitable"
|-
! width="160" |[A] (mol/L)
| [] ≈ 0.5 []
| 10−1
| 10−2
| 10−3
| 10−4
| 10−5
| 10−6
| 10−7
| 10−10
|-
! width="160" |Initial pH
| 2.38||2.88||3.39||3.91||4.47||5.15||6.02||6.79||7.00
|-
! width="160" |Final pH
| 6.75||7.25||7.75||8.14||8.25||8.26||8.26||8.26||8.27
|-
! width="160" |Dissolved (g/L of acid)
| 49.5||4.99||0.513||0.0848||0.0504||0.0474||0.0471||0.0470||0.0470
|}
This is because in the final state, the pH is larger than the pKa, so that the weak acid is almost completely dissociated, yielding in the end as many  ions as the strong acid to "dissolve" the calcium carbonate.
 The calculation in the case of phosphoric acid (which is the most widely used for domestic applications) is more complicated since the concentrations of the four dissociation states corresponding to this acid must be calculated together with [], [], [], [] and []. The system may be reduced to a seventh degree equation for [] the numerical solution of which gives

{| class="wikitable"
|-
! width="160" |[A] (mol/L)
| 1
| 10−1
| 10−2
| 10−3
| 10−4
| 10−5
| 10−6
| 10−7
| 10−10
|-
! width="160" |Initial pH
| 1.08||1.62||2.25||3.05||4.01||5.00||5.97||6.74||7.00
|-
! width="160" |Final pH
| 6.71||7.17||7.63||8.06||8.24||8.26||8.26||8.26||8.27
|-
! width="160" |Dissolved (g/L of acid)
| 62.0||7.39||0.874||0.123||0.0536||0.0477||0.0471||0.0471||0.0470
|}

where [A] =  is the total acid concentration. Thus phosphoric acid is more efficient than a monoacid since at the final almost neutral pH, the second dissociated state concentration [] is not negligible (see phosphoric acid).

See also 

 Cuttlebone
 Cuttlefish
 Gesso
 Limescale
 Marble
 Ocean acidification
 Whiting event
 List of climate engineering topics
 Lysocline

References

External links
 
 
 ATC codes:  and 
 The British Calcium Carbonate Association – What is calcium carbonate 
 CDC – NIOSH Pocket Guide to Chemical Hazards – Calcium Carbonate

Calcium compounds
Carbonates
Limestone
Phosphate binders
Excipients
Antacids
Food stabilizers
E-number additives